Canrenoic acid is a synthetic steroidal antimineralocorticoid which was never marketed.

See also
 Potassium canrenoate
 Canrenone

References

Antimineralocorticoids
Carboxylic acids
Conjugated dienes
Enones
Pregnanes
Spirolactones
Steroidal antiandrogens
Tertiary alcohols